Stadiumi Butrinti is a purpose-built stadium in Sarandë, Albania. The stadium holds around 5,500 people, not all of which are seated.

References 

KF Butrinti
Buildings and structures in Sarandë
Football venues in Albania